Dibu may refer to:

 Dibu, aka Mi familia es un dibujo, Argentine television series
 Dibu 3, franchise sequel
 Dibu Ojerinde, Nigerian professor 
 Emiliano "Dibu" Martínez (born 1992), Argentine goalkeeper
 Soko Airport, by ICAO code